Wesley College is a co-residential college of 265 students within the University of Sydney. The college occupies a site on the main campus of the University of Sydney and was built on a sub-grant of Crown land. Wesley is one of six on-campus colleges at the University of Sydney which provide accommodation. In 1923 the college averaged 45 students. Originally the college accommodated only men but when women were admitted in 1969 Wesley became the first of the colleges within the University of Sydney to become co-educational. Its current head is Lisa Sutherland, who has held the position since 2010.

The college chapel owns a Latin version of the Bible dated to 1479, which may be the oldest bible in Australia.

Buildings

The Edwardian Gothic main wing of Wesley dates from 1917 and was designed by the winner of a competition Byera Hadley (1872–1937), an English-born architect who had emigrated to Australia in 1887. Construction of the design was expected to cost £20,000. The brown face brick and sandstone building originally consisted of the central wing, dining room, chapel and Master's residence. It has a steep slate roof and is topped with a copper flèche. The interiors are detailed in a neo-Gothic style with polished timber staircases and wainscotting, leadlight windows and quatrefoil plaster ceilings. The chapel was paid for by benefactor Frederick Cull.

In 1922 the building's original design by Hadley was completed with the opening of the Callaghan Wing. Alan Dwyer designed the Cecil Purser Wing in 1943 and in 1960 Brewster Murray added the Wylie Wing. Further extensions were added in 1965 when Fowell, Mansfield & Maclurcan increased the capacity of the chapel and in 1969 when the same firm designed the Tutors Wing.

Student life

Rawson Cup
Every year, Wesley men compete for the Rawson Cup, which was presented to the Sydney University Sports Union in 1906 by Admiral Sir Harry Rawson, and is the height of male intercollegiate sport. The cup is fought for throughout the year by men representing each of the University of Sydney colleges accumulating points by competing in cricket, rowing, swimming, rugby, tennis, soccer, basketball and athletics. Wesley has won the Rawson Cup on seven occasions.

Rosebowl Cup
The female sporting trophy, the Rosebowl Cup, has been won by Wesley on more occasions than any other college.

Social calendar
Students are also in charge of organising their own social calendar throughout the year, including sponsor bars, formal dinners, victory dinners, racing days, as well as the annual Informal (for 1200 people with live bands and DJs) and the annual Black Ball.

Masters 
 1916 (acting) Rev W Woolls Rutledge
 1916–1923 Rev Michael Scott Fletcher
 1923–1942 Rev Leslie Bennett
 1942–1964 Rev Bertram Wyllie
 1965–1976 Rev Norman Webb
 1977–1983 Rev James Udy
 1984–1996 Rev John Whitehead
 1997–2001 Rev John Evans
 2002–2009 Rev David Russell
 2010–present Lisa Sutherland

Notable alumni

Science, medicine, and academia

 Dennis A. Ahlburg, academic and university administrator
 Robyn Alders, veterinarian
 Allan G. Bromley, computer scientist/historian
 Hedley Bull FBA, Professor of International Relations
 Graeme James Caughley, ecologist
 Frederick Colin Courtice, Rhodes Scholar and Professor of Pathology
 Anna Donald, Rhodes Scholar and pioneer in the field of evidence-based medicine
 Donald William George AO, Vice-Chancellor of the University of Newcastle
 Seth Grant, neuroscientist
 Lester Hiatt, anthropologist
 Ove Hoegh-Guldberg, biologist and climate scientist
 John Irvine Hunter, anatomist
 Ray Ison, environmental scientist
 Keith Jones, surgeon and past president of the Australian Medical Association
 Clifford Kwan-Gett, pioneer of the artificial heart
 John Moulton OAM, former Wallabies team doctor
 Tim Murray, archaeologist
 Gordon Parker,  scientia professor of psychiatry at the University of New South Wales
 Stewart Turner, geophysicist

Politics, public service, and the law
 Reginald Barrett, Judge of the Supreme Court of NSW
 Rawdon Dalrymple, Rhodes Scholar and Australian Ambassador to the United States, Japan, Indonesia, and Israel
 John Dauth, Australian High Commissioner to the United Kingdom, New Zealand, and Malaysia 
 Karin Emerton, Judge of the Supreme Court of Victoria
 Ken Matthews, public servant
 Neville Perkins OAM, Northern Territory Politician and first Indigenous Australian to hold a shadow ministry in an Australian parliament
 Neil Pickard, NSW politician
 Walter Cresswell O'Reilly, public servant
 John Tierney, Senator for New South Wales
 Greg Urwin, Diplomat and Secretary General of the Pacific Islands Forum
 Julie Ward, Judge of the Supreme Court of NSW

Military
 Mervyn Brogan KBE, CB, Chief of Army

Business
 Henry Bosch, businessman
 David Johnson, former President and CEO of Campbell Soup Company

Royalty
 Taufa'ahau Tupou IV, King of Tonga

Arts and humanities
 Anna Broinowski, filmmaker
 Melissa Beowulf, portrait artist
 Malcolm Brown, Sydney Morning Herald journalist and non-fiction writer
 Rob Carlton, actor
 Libby Gleeson, Children's author
 Milton Osborne, historian
 Dolph Lundgren, actor
 Frank Walker, Journalist and non-fiction writer

Sports
 Talia Barnet-Hepples, World champion rower
 Adrienne Cahalan, sailor
 Gillian Campbell, Olympic rower
 Emma Fessey, Australian Champion rower
 Peter FitzSimons, former Wallaby & Journalist
 John Langford, Brumbies and Wallabies player
 Nick Larkin, cricketer
 Al Kanaar, Wallabies & NSW Waratahs rugby player
 David Lyons, Wallabies & NSW Waratahs rugby player
 Georgina Morgan, Olympic hockey player
 Nick Phipps, Wallabies & NSW Waratahs rugby player
 Faye Sultan, Kuwaiti Olympic Swimmer (exchange student from Williams College)
 John Treloar, Olympic track and field athlete
 Bronwen Watson, Olympic rower

Other
 Winston O'Reilly, Methodist minister
 Anna Rose, activist and co-founded the Australian Youth Climate Coalition
 Gregory Stanton, founder of Genocide Watch
 Ian Stapleton, architect
 Dhananjayan Sriskandarajah, Rhodes Scholar and chief executive of Oxfam
 Keith Suter, futurist

Rhodes Scholars
 1923 Ambrose John Foote
 1933 Frederick Colin Courtice 
 1952 Rawdon Dalrymple 
 1955 Alan Edward Davis
 1970 Greg Houghton  
 1989 Anna Donald
 1995 Andrew Robertson
 1996 Stuart Grieve
 1998 Dhananjayan Sriskandarajah
 2000 Annaleise Grummitt
 2004 Nilay Hazari

References

External links 
 Wesley College Website

Methodism in Australia
Residential colleges of the University of Sydney
Uniting Church in Australia
1917 establishments in Australia
Educational institutions established in 1917